The 2012 Relentless International North West 200 was the 73rd running of the motorcycle road racing event which took place between 13–19 May 2012 at the circuit, known as "The Triangle", based around the towns of Portstewart, Coleraine and Portrush, in Northern Ireland.  All practice sessions took place during the day and the event was extended to include races on the Thursday evening.

The Northern Ireland First Minister, Peter Robinson, and Minister for Tourism, Arlene Foster joined Technical Director Mervyn Whyte along with many top riders at the launch of the event. Thursday night also included two races for the first time: a Superstock and newly introduced Supertwin race. Saturday saw a total of five races and all races except the Supertwin was held over six laps.

BBC Northern Ireland continued as the official media partner of the event and provided extensive coverage to the North West 200 across all three platforms: on-line, television and radio.

Results

Practice
During practice on Tuesday Alastair Seeley set the fastest times in both the Superbike and Supersport classes.

Race Results

Race 1; 1000cc Superstock Race final standings 
Thursday 17 May 2012 6 laps – 53.656 miles

Fastest Lap: Alastair Seeley – Suzuki, 4 minutes, 49.008 seconds;  on lap 6

Race 2; 650cc Supertwins Race final standings 
Thursday 17 May 2012 4 laps – 35.724 miles

Fastest Lap: Ryan Farquhar – Kawasaki, 5 minutes, 21.356 seconds;  on lap 2

Race 3; 600cc Supersport Race final standings 
Saturday 19 May 2012 4 laps – 35.724 miles

Fastest Lap: William Dunlop – Honda, 4 minutes, 39.142 seconds;  on lap 3

Race 4; 1000cc Superbike (I) Race final standings 
Saturday 19 May 2012 6 laps – 53.656 miles

Fastest Lap: Alastair Seeley – Suzuki, 4 minutes, 25.570 seconds;  on lap 4

See also
North West 200 - History and results from the event

References

External links
https://web.archive.org/web/20070309173345/http://www.northwest200.org/ The Official North 200 Website
http://www.bbc.co.uk/northernireland/nw200/ BBC North West 200 Website

2012
2012 in British motorsport
Sport in County Londonderry
Sport in County Antrim
2012 in Northern Ireland sport
Coleraine
2012 in motorcycle sport
May 2012 sports events in the United Kingdom